Lisandro is a male first name, particularly common in Argentina. Its origin comes from the Ancient Greek language, and is believed to have been popularized thanks to Lysander, a Spartan military and political leader.

It may refer to:

 Lisandro Abadie (born 1974), Argentine bass-baritone
 Lisandro Alonso (born 1975), Argentine film director
 Lisandro Alvarado (1858-1929), Venezuelan physician, naturalist, historian, ethnologist and linguist
 Lisandro Arbizu, Argentine rugby union player
 Lisandro de la Torre, Argentine politician
 Lisandro López (footballer, born 1983), Argentine footballer
 Lisandro López (footballer, born 1989), Argentine footballer
 Lisandro Martínez, Argentine footballer
 Jeff Lisandro, Australian professional poker player
 Lisandro Formation, Cretaceous rocks of the Neuquén Group in Argentina